The 2018–19 Maltese FA Trophy was the 81st edition of the football cup competition. A record number of 67 clubs competed in the FA Trophy, with the first round starting on the weekend of 1–2 September 2018 and concluding with the final played on 18 May 2019.

Valletta were the defending champions, but lost in the final to Balzan on penalties, the latter winning their first ever FA Trophy title.

Format 

The clubs in the Premier League, First Division, Second Division and Third Division together with those from the Gozo Football League are involved in the draws of the initial rounds. The 14 top-flight sides enter the fray in the third round. Matches which are level after regulation advanced to extra time and afterwards to penalties to determine a winner, when needed.

Schedule 

The draws were made on 6 August 2018 and were conducted by Dr. Angelo Chetcuti, the General Secretary of the Malta Football Association, and Rodney Pisani, the Deputy General Secretary of the Association who leads the Competitions Department.

Preliminary round 

Eight preliminary round matches were played on 31 August till 2 September 2018. The draw for the preliminary, first, and second rounds was held on 6 August 2018.

First round 

Nine first round matches were played on 8-9 September 2018. The draw for the preliminary, first, and second rounds was held 6 August 2018.

Second round 

Eighteen second round matches were played on 26 and 28 October 2018. The draw for the preliminary, first, and second rounds was held 6 August 2018. AAll teams from Maltese First Division and Maltese Second Division entered in the Second round.

Third round 
Sixteen third round matches were played on 30 November and 3 December 2018. The draw for the third and fourth rounds was held 5 November 2018. All teams from Maltese Premier League entered in Third round.
The top six position from 2017-18 Maltese Premier League teams that are seeded in the third round of the FA Trophy. A total of thirty-two clubs will be involved in the draw.

Fourth round 
Eight fourth round matches were played on 26–27 January 2019. The draw for the third and fourth rounds was held 5 November 2018. In the Fourth Round there were 10 clubs from Maltese Premier League, 3 clubs from Maltese First Division, 2 clubs from Maltese Second Division and 1 club (Xewkija Tigers) from Gozo Football League left.

Quarter-finals 

Four quarter-final matches were scheduled for 23 and 24 February 2019. The draw for the quarter-finals was held 29 January 2019. The eight clubs left were all from the Premier League. On 23 February 2019, four quarter-final matches were postponed amid safety concerns caused by the inclement weather, warnings of gale-force winds and hail-storm. The first FA Trophy quarter-final match between Pietà Hotspurs and Gżira United, at the Hibernians Stadium, was abandoned by referee Emanuel Grech in the 88th minute, and finished on 3 May 2019 at Ta' Qali National Stadium, 19:00, from the point of abandonment.

Semi-finals 
Two semi-final matches were played on 11 and 12 May 2019 at National Stadium, Ta' Qali. The draw for the semi-finals was held on 3 May 2019.

Final 
The final took place on 18 May 2019; Balzan reached their second FA Trophy final while Valletta reached their 24th final which they triumphed 14 times. The last time Balzan and Valletta met together in the FA Trophy was the previous season in the semi-finals when Valletta beat Balzan by 2–1.

Television rights 

The following matches were broadcast live on TVM2 and on TSN (offered by GO):

See also 
 2018–19 Maltese Premier League

References

External links 
 Official FA Trophy website
 The Maltese FA Trophy on UEFA

Malta
Maltese FA Trophy seasons
Cup